Christian History is a magazine on the history of Christianity. It was established by Ken Curtis in 1982 and published by the Christian History Institute. It began as a series of resource guides designed to supplement films about major figures in the history of the church, transitioning from an "occasional" publication to a quarterly magazine in 1984. In 1989, it was sold to Christianity Today International, which changed the name of the magazine to Christian History & Biography in 2004. In 2008 publication ceased after issue 99. Christian History Institute reclaimed custody of the title and revived the publication in 2011.

References

External links 
 
 Christian History Archives (1982-2008) at Christianity Today.

1982 establishments in the United States
Quarterly magazines published in the United States
Christian magazines
History magazines published in the United States
Magazines established in 1982
Magazines published in Illinois
Magazines published in Pennsylvania